Wunderlich refers to a series of vacuum tubes introduced in the early 1930s.  Wunderlichs were designed to be used as full-wave detectors in AM radio receivers.  However, because of their unusual design, they were rarely used in commercially manufactured receivers.  The tube is named for its inventor, Norman Wunderlich.

Structure
The Wunderlich tube is a twin medium-mu triode.  The tube has two identical control grids that operate in tandem with a common heater, indirectly heated cathode and plate.

Function
Typically, the two grids are connected to opposite ends of the center-tapped secondary of the final IF transformer.  The center tap of the secondary is then connected to ground through a parallel-connected resistor and capacitor circuit.  This causes the tube to act as a full-wave grid leak detector.  In some circuits, the center tap also provides AVC bias voltage to the converter and/or IF amplifier.  Some Wunderlichs, like the Wunderlich B, have a diode plate or a second grid that provide AVC bias voltage.

External links
Schematic of the Mission Bell model 19 car radio.  One of the few radios produced in the United States to use a Wunderlich detector (type 70).
 Radiomuseum.org discussion page about Wunderlich tubes.
 Vacuum Tubes Inc. article about Wunderlich tubes.

Analog circuits
Radio technology
Vacuum tubes